Keelung Station is a railway station in Ren'ai District, Keelung, Taiwan served by Taiwan Railways. The station was built in 1891, and has gone through several renovations.

Overview

The station has three stories (two aboveground, one underground).

Platform layout

History
1891-10-20: A station to the north of the current station was opened (Keelung Train Pier) when the railroad segment from Keelung to Tsui-tng-ka Pier was completed.
1893-10-20: The rail line from Keelung to Taipeh (Taipei) was completed.
1908-10-30: The third-generation station (with clock tower) was opened for service. The style is similar to Hsinchu and Taichung stations, which opened at around the same time.
April 1914: The rail line from Keelung to Haccho was completed.
1967-01-23: The fourth-generation station was completed.
1968: Station underpass was completed.
1968-04-05: The Keelung Railway Restaurant was added to the station.
1985-06-06: The aforementioned restaurant closed.
2013-06-08: One of the station's footbridges collapsed, injuring one woman and delaying the train schedule.
2015-06-29: The current (fifth-generation) station was completed, at a new location to the south of Zhong 1st Road. The NT$2.6 billion project included  of track, including the route to Sankeng Station, and the elimination of two level crossings. The previous station will be converted into an art exhibition venue.

Around the station
 Keelung City Government
 Keelung City Council
 Keelung Civic Plaza
 Keelung City Tourism Center
 Keelung Station Circle
 Keelung Transfer Station
 YM Oceanic Culture and Art Museum
 Keelung Cultural Center
 Keelung Fort Commander's Official Residence
 Huzishan Keelung Landmark
 Keelung Night Market
 Renai Market
 Kanziding Fish Market
 Keelung East Coast Shopping Mall (基隆東岸商場)
 Port of Keelung
 Keelung Maritime Plaza
 Keelung Harbor Building
 Border Square (國門廣場)
 West Passenger Terminal
 West coast ports and storage
 Zhong 1st Road Harbor Trail
 Hsieh-ho Power Plant

See also
 List of railway stations in Taiwan

References

External links 

TRA Keelung Station 
Taiwan Railways Administration

1891 establishments in Taiwan
Railway stations served by Taiwan Railways Administration
Railway stations in Keelung
Railway stations opened in 1891